Mophead: How Your Difference Makes a Difference is a memoir in graphic novel form, written and illustrated by the poet and academic Selina Tusitala Marsh. It is published by Auckland University Press. On 12 November 2020 Mophead Tu: The Queen's Poem  was published.

For the 2020 Pop Up Penguin art trail in Christchurch a Mophead penguin was made by artist Lisa Rudman.

Awards 
In August 2020 Mophead was the supreme winner at the New Zealand Book Awards for Children and Young Adults, and also won the Margaret Mahy Book of the Year and Elsie Locke Award for Non-fiction. In October 2020 Mophead won three awards at the Publishers Association of New Zealand Book Design Awards – the Gerard Reid Award for Best Book, Best children's book and the PANZ People’s Choice Award – recognising the design skills of Vida Kelly.

References

External links

 

2019 children's books
2019 graphic novels
2019 non-fiction books
Picture books
New Zealand children's books
New Zealand non-fiction books
Memoirs
Auckland University Press books